American Football Association of Finland (Finnish: Suomen Amerikkalaisen Jalkapallon Liitto, abbreviated SAJL) is the national governing body of American football in Finland. It was founded in 1979 and it is a founding member of the European Federation of American Football, EFAF and International Federation of American Football, IFAF. Since 2000, American football has grown steadily. In 2006 there were 27 clubs playing the sport with over 100 teams and over 1400 players. In 2012, the association's competitions fielded over 150 teams with more than 2200 licensed players.

The President of the American Football Association of Finland is Roope Noronen.

Members
The sport, like it is in the vast majority of other sports, is club-based in Finland. In 2013, the association had a total of 36 active member clubs. The largest number of clubs (5) come from capital city Helsinki, with 3 more hailing from the metropolitan area or neighboring municipalities. Besides Helsinki, Jyväskylä is the only other city that host two or more clubs (Jaguaarit, men's and junior teams and Jaguars, a club fielding women's team)

Leagues
In Finland, American football is played in men's, women's and youth leagues.

Men

Men's teams are divided into four divisions with provisional promotion and relegation rules.
  
 Vaahteraliiga - National premier league. The final game is called Vaahteramalja (Maple Bowl). Relegation to 1st division. Played with 6 to 8 teams.
 1st division – The 2nd tier league below Maple League. The final game is called Spagettimalja (Spaghetti Bowl). Promotion to Maple League and relegation to 2nd division. Played normally with 6 teams.
 2nd division – League plays 11-man football. The final game is called Rautamalja (Iron Bowl). Promotion to 1st division, no direct relegation. The number of teams is eight.
 3rd division – Lowest league to play 11-man football. The final game is called Tinamalja (Tin Bowl). Promotion to 2nd division, no direct relegation. The number of teams is seven in 2017.
 4th division – The 7-man football league for starting clubs and reserve teams. No direct promotion. The number of teams varies from year to year.

League license system

The two highest tiers have a league license system in place, hence no promotion and relegation between these and 2nd division are ever based on competitive results alone. In addition to competitive status, teams have to reach a certain level when it comes to economics and organizational structure. They must meet a number of standards in different fields, such as the number of licensed players, the number of junior teams, etc. The criteria are the same with Maple League and 1st division licenses, however, for League teams, the standards are higher.

After each season teams must apply for a place in the Maple League and the 1st division. Teams eligible to apply for a spot in Maple League are the ones ranked from #1 to #10 in the national ranking, including Maple League teams from the previous season, plus 2–4 of the best teams from the 1st division, depending on the number of Maple League teams the previous year. The teams that are eligible for 1st division are the teams from the previous year and the two best from 2nd division. SAJL checks the applications and grants licenses according to their seed in the previous season. In seeding the teams, the winner of Spaghetti Bowl overtakes the last team from Maple League and the winner of 2nd division is favored before the last teams from 1st division.

The system was put in place largely to ensure long-term planning and sensible running of clubs. The system has already shown its cruelty as teams with no alarming difficulties in competitiveness have been relegated due to lack of management and/or economic difficulties.

Realignment for 2014

Principle decisions have been made to realign the competition structure for the 2014 season.

The most noticeable change will be a new level of competition that will be added between the current 2nd and 3rd division. This has been seen as a necessary step towards making a separation between teams in the current 2nd division. Due to its large size (most teams in SAJL competitions of any age group) and its status as the lowest level of 11-man football, the 2nd division carries a wide range of teams with great differences in the level of play and goals as an organization. The new 2nd division would comprise the top-tier team of the current 2nd division, giving them the chance to play more games between teams of their level. The new league dubbed as "the new 3rd division", would now serve as the lowest-tier 11-man football league. It would also provide a better platform for starting and lower-level teams.

Youth and women's leagues

Youth leagues run in 21 and under, 19 and under, 17 and under, 15 and under and 13 and under categories which are called A-, B-, C-, D- and E-juniors respectively. Except for E-juniors, all age classes have championship and division leagues. There are no direct promotion or relegation between the two levels, clubs are free to sign up according to their preference. Championship league winners, however, are given the title of national champion of their respective age class. In championship leagues, A-, B- and C-juniors play with normal 11-man  and D-juniors with 9-man rules.  All division leagues from A to D-juniors and E-juniors are played with 7-man rules.

Women have previously played flag football, but the league for tackle football for women had its inaugural season in 2008. Women play with 9-on-9 rules. 1st division with 7-on-7 rules will be started in 2013. From 2014 season on women's championship series is played with 11-on-11 rules as is the international competition organized by IFAF.

National teams
SAJL currently fields five national teams: men's senior, U-19, U-17, U-15 and women's team.

Men's Senior National Team
The men's national team has taken a part in European Championship tournaments since their beginning in 1983. The Finnish National team is the most successful team in Europe, being the only team to participate in all final tournaments and having won European Championship 5 times (1985, 1993, 1995, 1997 and 2000) while finishing second in 1983, 1991 and 2001 and third in 1987 and 2005. The national team has also taken part in 1999 World Championship tournament and 2003 and 2007 qualifications.

Currently, Finland is viewed as 5th ranked team in Europe based on the result of 2010 EFAF European Championship, where Finland's only victory came in the 5th place game against Great Britain. The Germany-based tournament was originally awarded to Finland and was scheduled to be held in 2009 but it was later postponed due to women's football European Championships (also hosted by Finland and Finnair Stadium, the slated venue for the EFAF competition too).

Men's U-19 National Team
The first junior national team was ensembled in 1988. The first years saw just single games against amateur club teams from Nordic countries. In 1992, the first-ever European Junior Championship was held in Toulouse, France. Finland entered the competition with a team now consisting of players, according to new international rules, 19 years old and under. Finland was crowned as the first European Junior Champions beating Italy in the semifinal game and the host nation France in the final game. Finland has since participated every time in the biannual event - apart from the 2002 competition when they lost the qualification game to the Czech Republic. Finland was the most successful team in the first years of the competition, winning the first three titles followed by a bronze medal. The new millennium has seen the tightening of competition with new participants and the rise of powerhouses like Germany. Since losing the bronze game in 2000 EJC, Finland has not qualified for the medal games.

Finland was in the race for spots in the first World Junior Championship to be held in Ohio, USA in summer 2009. Qualification was done in the 2008 EJC with three top teams granted a spot. Finland, finishing 7th, fell short as Germany, Sweden and France prevailed.

Finland has also participated in Nordic Junior Championship played biannually since 1997, winning four gold and two silver medals. Finland will host the 8th Championship played in Vantaa in October 2010.

The junior national team has a history of being the showcase of best youth talent in Finnish American football. Many of Finland's best players have starred the junior team during their careers, including Michael Quarshie, Seppo Evwaraye and Klaus Alinen.

Men's U-17 National Team
The project for creating a new junior national team for younger players that weren't yet getting playing time in the U-19 team began in 2007. The age limit was first set to 16. With one and a half years on preparation, the team was set to take part in Nordic Championship scheduled to be held in Tampere, Finland. The tournament was eventually canceled because of financial difficulties of Norway and Denmark. Finland had to settle to a game against Sweden. However, this match was given the championship's status and Finland went on to win the inaugural U-16 Nordic Championship beating Sweden 33-6.

As of the 2009 season, the age limit for this junior class was set to 17 to meet EFAF regulations.

Men's U-15 National Team

Flag football
Finland has been an eager participant in international tournaments in youth flag football. Their best result so far has been fourth place in the 2006 European Championships. U15 European Championships in 9-man flag football was played from 1995 to 1999. Finland won 4 of those 5 European Championships. Finland did not participate in the 9-man Flag in 1999.

Development team for contact football
Due to the rise of contact football as the pre-eminent form of play amongst 11 to 15-year-olds, a new team will be formed in fall 2013. Naming it "U-15 Development Team" is a conscious decision not to call it a "national team", but instead a team which gathers talented players from the age group to develop their skill for upcoming junior national teams.

Women's National Team
The women's national team started in 2000. In the 2004 World Championship, Finland's two teams took silver in the 7vs7 competition and placed fourth in 5vs5's. The big success came the next year in the European Championships when the team went undefeated to claim the title. In the 2006 World Championships, they took bronze and in 2007 they narrowly failed to defend their title in the EC, taking silver.

The newest addition to the association's list of national teams is the women's tackle football team. After years of flag football and semi-contact, women's tackle football was introduced in 2008. The women's team also hosted Sweden in a historical international game between two women's tackle football teams. Finland's experience became plainly obvious with a crushing victory with a score of 66–0.

With the growth of women's American football in many countries, IFAF has established Women’s World Championship of American Football and the first-ever tournament was hosted by Sweden in late June 2010. The USA took the inaugural championship, beating Canada in the final game 66–0. Finland earned its place as Europe's top country with a 26–18 victory over Germany in the bronze game.

Finland will host the second IFAF Women's World Championship in the summer of 2013.

Finland vs. Sweden
Throughout its time as an independent state, Finland has had big rivalries in all fields of sport against its neighboring country Sweden, and American Football makes no exception.

The men's senior team played an annual game against Sweden in 1992–1998. The tradition was revived in 2003 and it is nowadays a fixture in national team's yearly schedule.

The U-19 team also had its encounters with Sweden in the '90s but in recent years the juniors have faced only in international tournaments.

The two newest national teams, U-17's and women's, also had their first taste of the rivalry in 2008. Both series have been continuous from their inaugural year on.

Finnish American Football Hall of Fame

To honor people distinguished in Finnish American Football over the years, the SAJL founded the Finnish American Football Hall of Fame in 2004. Induction can be merited for the work done both on and off the field and to anyone with enough contributions to the sport in Finland.

Members of Finnish American Football Hall Of Fame

References

External links
Suomen Amerikkalaisen Jalkapallon Liitto ry, official website in Finnish
SAJL on the EFAF Website
SAJL on the IFAF Website

American football in Finland
Sports governing bodies in Finland
Fin
Sports organizations established in 1979
1979 establishments in Finland